Canton des Basques is a settlement in New Brunswick. The name was also applied to an area of the local service district of the Parish of Saumarez with enhanced services, now part of the Regional Municipality of Tracadie.

History

Notable people

See also
List of communities in New Brunswick

References

Communities in Gloucester County, New Brunswick
Designated places in New Brunswick
Local service districts of Gloucester County, New Brunswick